Benarkin North is a rural locality in the South Burnett Region, Queensland, Australia.

Geography 
The land use is a mix of rural residential and grazing on native vegetation.

History 
The locality name Benarkin takes its name from ''Benarqui'' from the Dungibara language which refers to the blackbutt tree (Eucalyptus pilularis) which is common in the district.

On 1 February 2018, Benarkin North's postcode changed from 4306 to 4314.

References 

South Burnett Region
Localities in Queensland